Jhunir, sometimes spelled  Jhuner, is a town in the Sardulgarh tehsil of Mansa district in Punjab, India. It is also a block of the district.

Geography

Mansa is the nearest railway station, lying  to its north, Sardulgarh (17 km) to the southwest, the city and district of Bathinda to the northeast and the city and district of Sangrur to the northeast.

Demographics

At the 2011 census, Jhunir had a total population of 7,159 with 1,429 households, 3,703 males and 3,456 females. Thus males constituted 52% and females 48% of the population with the sex ratio of 883 females per thousand males.

As a development block
As a development block of the district it has many villages under it including, Raipur, Khiali Chehlan Wali, Burj Bhalaike , Bire Wala Jattan and Ullak.

References

Cities and towns in Mansa district, India